Oxitropium bromide (trade names Oxivent, Tersigan) is an anticholinergic used as a bronchodilator for the treatment of asthma and chronic obstructive pulmonary disease.

It was patented in 1966 and approved for medical use in 1983.

References 

Bronchodilators
Muscarinic antagonists
Quaternary ammonium compounds
Epoxides
Bromides